Miss Universe 2021 was the 70th Miss Universe pageant, held at the Universe Dome in Eilat, Israel on December 13, 2021.

At the end of the event, Andrea Meza of Mexico crowned Harnaaz Sandhu of India as Miss Universe 2021. It is India's first victory in 21 years, and the third victory of the country in the pageant's history. Sandhu became the first ever Sikh to win the title of Miss Universe, and the first contestant born in the 2000s to win in any of the Big Four international beauty pageants.

Contestants from 80 countries and territories competed in this year's pageant. The competition featured the return of Steve Harvey as host; Harvey last served as host during Miss Universe 2019. Cheslie Kryst, who previously crowned as Miss USA 2019, and Carson Kressley served as backstage correspondents. JoJo, Noa Kirel, Harel Skaat, Valerie Hamaty, and Narkis performed in this year's pageant.

The competition also featured the return of Fox as the official broadcaster of the show after being absent for the previous edition. It was broadcast to hundreds of millions of viewers in 172 countries. This was also the final edition to be aired on an American broadcast television network.

Background

Location and date

In January 2021, the Miss Universe Organization was reportedly in talks to host the 2021 edition of the competition in Costa Rica in late 2021 or early 2022. The negotiations were later confirmed by Gustavo Segura, serving as the Minister of Tourism in the government of Costa Rica. In May 2021, in her first interview to People en Español after her coronation, Andrea Meza stated that the next edition of the pageant could possibly take place at the end of 2021. She also acknowledged the fact that her reign would be one of the shortest in the history of the pageant.

Two months after the interview, the Miss Universe Organization confirmed that the competition would be in Eilat, Israel in December 2021. On October 27, 2021, the pageant was confirmed to be on December 12, 2021 at the Universe Dome, a custom-built and temporary arena imported to Eilat from Portugal. Also announced was that the chosen venue was to work with maximum capacity (5,000 spectators) to avoid precautious concerns on a potential COVID-19 resurgence, after the 2020 pageant (held in May 2021) was scaled down to 1,750 spectators (nearly one-quarter of the venue capacity) due to the ongoing worldwide COVID-19 pandemic.

Selection of participants
Contestants from 80 countries and territories were selected to compete in the competition. Twenty-seven of these delegates were appointees to their positions after being a runner-up of their national pageant or being selected through a casting process, while two were selected to replace the original dethroned winner.

Amandine Petit, Miss France 2021, was initially supposed to compete in Miss Universe 2021, while Clémence Botino, Miss France 2020, was supposed to compete in Miss Universe 2020. A switch happened between the two delegates due to a potential date conflict between Miss Universe 2021 and Miss France 2022, at which Petit was contractually obligated to be present. Debbie Aflalo, originally the first runner-up of Miss Dominican Republic 2021, was appointed to represent the country after the original winner, Andreína Martínez, tested positive for COVID-19 shortly before her scheduled departure. Kawtar Benhalima, originally the first runner-up of Miss Universe Morocco 2021, was appointed to represent the country after the original winner, Fatima-Zahra Khayat, was injured in a car accident.

The 2021 edition saw the debut of Bahrain and the return of Equatorial Guinea, Germany, Greece, Guatemala, Hungary, Kenya, Morocco, Namibia, Nigeria, Sweden, and Turkey; Morocco last competed in 1978, which makes the country's first time to compete after four decades of withdrawing from Miss Universe, Greece, Guatemala, and Hungary last competed in 2018, while the others last competed in 2019. Barbados, Belize, Indonesia, and Malaysia withdrew for travel restrictions while Myanmar and Uruguay withdrew for undisclosed reasons. Expected to debut in the competition was the United Arab Emirates, but plans changed following the cancellation of its national pageant.

Botino later tested positive for COVID-19 upon arriving in Israel, and was taken to a government isolation hotel. She had been fully vaccinated, and had tested upon departure. Botino was released from quarantine after ten days and was authorized to rejoin the competition.

Incidents before the pageant 
Miss South Africa Lalela Mswane, who was eventually finish as the second runner-up at the pageant, was called upon to withdraw to the pageant due the fact that was held to be in Israel. In a unprocendent fact she refused to boycott the competition despite strong pressure from the South African government, which withdrew their support after many tryouts to persuade Mswane and South African franchising owners to pull out of the pageant. Minister of Arts, Sport and Culture. Nathi Mthethwa announced that the government refused to associate itself with the pageant as “the atrocities committed by Israel against Palestinians are well documented.”

Results

Placements

§ - Voted into the Top 16 by viewers

Special awards

Pageant

Format 
The Miss Universe Organization introduced several specific changes to the format for this edition. The number of semifinalists was reduced to 16— the same number of semifinalists in 2017. The results of the preliminary competition— which consisted of the swimsuit and evening gown competition, and the closed-door interview, determined the 16 semifinalists selected at large. The internet voting is still being implemented, with fans being able to vote for another delegate to advance into the semifinals. The top 16 competed in the swimsuit competition and were narrowed down to the top 10 afterward. The top 10 competed in the evening gown competition and were narrowed down to the top 5 afterward. The top 5 competed in the preliminary question and answer round, and the final 3 was chosen. The final word portion was brought back, after which Miss Universe 2021 and her two runners-up were announced.

Selection committee 
Lori Harvey – American model and daughter of Steve Harvey
Adriana Lima – Brazilian model
Adamari López – Puerto Rican actress
Iris Mittenaere – Miss Universe 2016 from France
Urvashi Rautela – Indian actress and Miss Universe India 2015
Marian Rivera – Filipino actress and model
Rena Sofer – American actress (only as final telecast judge)
Cheslie Kryst † – American television presenter and Miss USA 2019 (only as preliminary judge)
Rina Mor – Miss Universe 1976 from Israel (only as preliminary judge)

Contestants
80 contestants competed for the title.

Notes

References

External links
 

2021
2021 beauty pageants
2021 in Israel
Eilat